The 1921–22 season was the 45th Scottish football season in which Dumbarton competed at national level, entering the Scottish Football League and the Scottish Cup.  In addition Dumbarton entered the Dumbartonshire Cup and the Dumbartonshire Charity Cup.

Scottish League

Dumbarton's league performance showed a slight improvement on the previous season by finishing 20th out of 22 with 30 points, some way behind champions Celtic.

Promotion/Relegation
Unfortunately the re-forming of the Second Division co-incided with the introduction of automatic promotion/relegation, and Dumbarton were relegated for the following season.

Scottish Cup

In the Scottish Cup, Dumbarton were knocked out in the first round by Aberdeen.

Dumbartonshire Cup
Dumbarton won the Dumbartonshire Cup by topping the league and defeating Dumbarton Harp in the final after a replay.

League table

Dumbartonshire Charity Cup
Dumbarton retained the Dumbartonshire Charity Cup by defeating Clydebank (on corners) in the final.

Friendlies
At the end of the season Dumbarton embarked on their first 'official' foreign tour, playing 8 matches in Norway and Sweden, winning 5, drawing 1 and losing 2, scoring 15 goals for the loss of 11.  Two other friendlies were played against Vale of Leven and Leith Athletic.

Player statistics

|}

Source:

Transfers

Players in

Players out 

Source:

In addition William Aitken, Alex Marshall, James McDonald and George Rae all played their final 'first XI' games in Dumbarton colours.

Reserve Team
Dumbarton Reserves played in the Scottish Alliance League and also in the Scottish Second XI Cup.

References

Dumbarton F.C. seasons
Scottish football clubs 1921–22 season